Michael Derrick (1915–1961) was a Catholic journalist.

Michael Derrick may also refer to:

Mike Derrick (baseball) (1943–2009), Major League Baseball player for the Boston Red Sox
Mikel Derrick (1952–1990), convicted murderer executed in the U.S. state of Texas
Mike Derrick (politician), candidate for U.S. Congress in New York's 21st congressional district

See also
 Michael Derrick Hudson (born 1963), American poet and librarian